Nicholas Charles Handy  (17 June 1941 – 2 October 2012) was a British theoretical chemist. He retired as Professor of quantum chemistry at the University of Cambridge in September 2004.

Education and early life
Handy was born in Wiltshire, England and educated at Clayesmore School. He studied the Mathematical Tripos at the University of Cambridge and completed his PhD on theoretical chemistry supervised by Samuel Francis Boys.

Research
Handy wrote 320 scientific papers published in physical and theoretical chemistry journals.
Handy developed several methods in quantum chemistry and theoretical spectroscopy. His contributions have helped greatly to the understanding of:
 the transcorrelated method 
 the long range behaviour of Hartree–Fock orbitals
 semiclassical methods for vibrational energies
 the variational method for rovibrational wave-functions (in normal mode and internal coordinates)
 Full configuration interaction with Slater determinants (benchmark studies)
 convergence of the Møller–Plesset series
 the reaction path Hamiltonian
 Anharmonic spectroscopic and thermodynamic properties using higher derivative methods
 Brueckner-doubles theory
 Open shell Møller–Plesset theory
 frequency-dependent properties 
 Density functional theory : quadrature, new functionals and molecular properties.

Awards and honours
Handy was elected a Fellow of the Royal Society (FRS) in 1990. He was awarded the Leverhulme Medal in 2002 and was a member of the International Academy of Quantum Molecular Science.

Death
On 2 October 2012 Nicholas died after a brief battle with pancreatic cancer.

References

1941 births
2012 deaths
British chemists
Theoretical chemists
Fellows of the Royal Society
Members of the International Academy of Quantum Molecular Science
Alumni of St Catharine's College, Cambridge
Fellows of St Catharine's College, Cambridge
Schrödinger Medal recipients
People educated at Clayesmore School